The men's field hockey tournament at the 2000 Summer Olympics was the 19th edition of the field hockey event for men at the Summer Olympic Games. It was held over a fifteen-day period beginning on 16 September, and culminating with the medal finals on 30 September. All games were played at the hockey centre within the Olympic Park in Sydney, Australia.

Defending champions the Netherlands won the gold medal for the second time after defeating South Korea 5–4 in the final on penalty strokes after a 3–3 draw. Australia won the bronze medal by defeating Pakistan 6–3.

Qualification
Each of the continental champions from five federations and the host nation received an automatic berth. The European federation received one extra quota based upon the FIH World Rankings. Alongside the teams qualifying through the Olympic Qualification Tournament, twelve teams competed in this tournament.

 – South Africa qualified but gave up their automatic berth on the premise that there weren't enough black players in the team. Argentina took their place as the 7th ranked team at the Olympic Qualification Tournament.
 – Australia qualified both as host and continental champion, therefore that quota was added to the ones awarded by the 2000 Men's Field Hockey Olympic Qualifier to a total of 6.

Squads

Preliminary round
All times are Eastern Daylight Time (UTC+11:00)

Pool A

Pool B

Classification round

Ninth to twelfth place classification

Crossover

Eleventh and twelfth place

Ninth and tenth place

Fifth to eighth place classification

Crossover

Seventh and eighth place

Fifth and sixth place

Medal round

Semi-finals

Bronze medal match

Gold medal match

Final rankings

Goalscorers

References

External links
Official FIH website

Men
Men's events at the 2000 Summer Olympics